Opacity or opaque may refer to:
 Impediments to (especially, visible) light:
 Opacities, absorption coefficients
 Opacity (optics), property or degree of blocking the transmission of light
 Metaphors derived from literal optics:
 In linguistics:
 Opaque context, a term to describe the linguistic context of co-referential terms
 Phonological opacity, a term in phonology
 Semantic opacity, the opposite of semantic transparency
 Opaque travel inventory, the market of selling unsold travel inventory at a discounted price
 Musical works:
 Opacities (EP)
 Computer science:
 Measure of obscuration of background by "painting"  an image, e.g. alpha channel
 Use of an opaque data type 
 Property attributed to data that can be interpreted only by using an external entity, e.g. magic cookie technology
 Opaque binary blob, a network-engineering and computer-science technology